Cleopatra Ayesha Borel (from 2005 until 2010 Borel-Brown; born 10 March 1979) is a female shot putter from Plaisance, Mayaro, Trinidad and Tobago and a 2014 Sportswoman of the Year Award recipient.

Early life
Borel is a graduate of Mayaro Government Primary School and a former attendee of Mayaro Composite School and Saint Stephen's College, Princes Town, Trinidad. In 2002 she graduated from the University of Maryland, Baltimore County with a bachelor's degree in health psychology and pre-physical therapy and later pursued a master's degree in Interdisciplinary Studies from Virginia Tech.

Career
In 2018 Cleopatra Borel participated at the Launch Meeting Circuit of Central Coliseum - National Stadium in Chile, receiving her second gold medal for the year. In April of the same year, she participated at the 2018 Commonwealth Games at which she lost a bronze medal to Brittany Crew. Her personal best throw is 19.42 metres, achieved in July 2011 at the Paris Diamond League Meeting. She has a personal best of 19.48 metres on the indoor track, achieved in February 2004 in Blacksburg.

Personal bests

Achievements

Personal life
In 2005, Borel married her college sweetheart Balvin Brown. The couple currently lives in Blacksburg, Virginia.

Cleopatra Borel returned to Trinidad in 2012 after the London Olympic Games, where she trained for the 2016 Games in Rio.

References

External links

1979 births
Living people
Trinidad and Tobago shot putters
Female shot putters
Trinidad and Tobago female athletes
Olympic athletes of Trinidad and Tobago
Athletes (track and field) at the 2004 Summer Olympics
Athletes (track and field) at the 2008 Summer Olympics
Athletes (track and field) at the 2012 Summer Olympics
Athletes (track and field) at the 2016 Summer Olympics
Athletes (track and field) at the 2003 Pan American Games
Athletes (track and field) at the 2007 Pan American Games
Athletes (track and field) at the 2011 Pan American Games
Athletes (track and field) at the 2015 Pan American Games
Athletes (track and field) at the 2019 Pan American Games
Pan American Games gold medalists for Trinidad and Tobago
Pan American Games medalists in athletics (track and field)
Commonwealth Games medallists in athletics
Athletes (track and field) at the 2002 Commonwealth Games
Athletes (track and field) at the 2006 Commonwealth Games
Athletes (track and field) at the 2010 Commonwealth Games
Athletes (track and field) at the 2014 Commonwealth Games
Athletes (track and field) at the 2018 Commonwealth Games
World Athletics Championships athletes for Trinidad and Tobago
University of Maryland, Baltimore County alumni
Virginia Tech alumni
Commonwealth Games silver medallists for Trinidad and Tobago
Commonwealth Games bronze medallists for Trinidad and Tobago
Central American and Caribbean Games gold medalists for Trinidad and Tobago
Competitors at the 2006 Central American and Caribbean Games
Competitors at the 2010 Central American and Caribbean Games
Competitors at the 2014 Central American and Caribbean Games
Competitors at the 2018 Central American and Caribbean Games
Central American and Caribbean Games medalists in athletics
Medalists at the 2015 Pan American Games
Medalists at the 2011 Pan American Games
Medallists at the 2010 Commonwealth Games
Medallists at the 2014 Commonwealth Games